Steffi Schmidt (born 13 January 1968) is a German former volleyball player. She competed for East Germany in the women's tournament at the 1988 Summer Olympics.

References

External links
 

1968 births
Living people
German women's volleyball players
Olympic volleyball players of East Germany
Volleyball players at the 1988 Summer Olympics
People from Staßfurt
Sportspeople from Saxony-Anhalt